The second season of Teenage Mutant Ninja Turtles aired in syndication. For most of this season, the Technodrome is located in Dimension X and Shredder is without Krang's help.

Episodes
 All thirteen second-season episodes were directed by Fred Wolf.

References

External links
TV Com

Teenage Mutant Ninja Turtles (1987 TV series) seasons
1988 American television seasons
Niagara Falls in fiction
Florida in fiction
Empire State Building in fiction